Zhang Chenglin (Pinyin: Zhāng Chénglín;  ;  born 20 January 1987 in Bengbu) is a Chinese professional footballer who currently plays for Chinese Super League club Guangzhou F.C.

Club career
Zhang Chenglin started his football career with Shenyang Ginde when he first played in a league game against Liaoning FC on 14 August 2005 in a 1–1 draw. He would often be used as a versatile substitute for the next several seasons and was part of the squad that moved to Changsha while the club renamed themselves Changsha Ginde. It wasn't until the arrival of Zhu Bo as the club's manager before Zhang started to become a more regular starter for the club and he went on to score his first league goal against Guangzhou Pharmaceutical on 3 July 2009 in a 4–2 win. By the 2010 league season, Zhang would start to settle within the team's central defense by the newly appointed manager Miodrag Ješić and would even start to produce a steady partnership with Wang Qiang. However, this was little too late for the club and the team were relegated at the end of season.

Zhang then transferred to top-tier side Shaanxi Chanba in December 2010 with his younger brother Zhang Chengxiang. He would go on to make his league debut for the club on 10 April 2011 against Shenzhen Ruby as a substitute for Li Chunyu in a 1–0 victory. After the game, he would then become a vital member within the team's defence and eventually go on to score his first goal for the club in a league game against Nanchang Hengyuan on 23 October 2011 in a 3–1 defeat. At the beginning of the 2012 season, Zhang followed the club when it decided to move to Guizhou and rename themselves Guizhou Renhe.

Zhang transferred to Chinese Super League side Guangzhou Evergrande on 29 November 2016. He made his debut on 10 March 2017 in a 2–1 away loss against Shandong Luneng Taishan, coming on as a substitute for Chen Zepeng in the 85th minute. On 1 August 2017, he scored his first goal for the club in the second leg of 2017 Chinese FA Cup fifth round against city rival Guangzhou R&F, which Guangzhou Evergrande won 7–2. On 28 October 2018, he scored his first league goal for Guangzhou in a 3–0 away win over Guizhou Hengfeng.

On 7 February 2019, Zhang was loaned to fellow first-tier club Tianjin Tianhai for the 2019 season.  On 1 March 2019, he made his debut for the club in a 3–0 away defeat against his former club Guangzhou Evergrande.

International career
On 12 October 2010, Zhang made his debut for the Chinese national team when the national team manager Gao Hongbo called him up for a friendly against Uruguay, which Zhang came on as a substitute for Yang Hao in a 4–0 defeat.

Career statistics
Statistics accurate as of match played on 13 December 2021.

Honours

Club
Beijing Renhe
 Chinese FA Cup: 2013
 Chinese FA Super Cup: 2014

Guangzhou Evergrande
Chinese Super League: 2017
Chinese FA Super Cup: 2018

Personal life
Zhang's younger brother Zhang Chengxiang, also a professional footballer, has played with him at Changsha Ginde (2007–2010) and Guizhou Renhe (2011–2014).

References

External links
 
 ZHANG CHENGLIN at Soccerway.com
 

1987 births
Living people
People from Bengbu
Chinese footballers
Footballers from Anhui
China international footballers
Changsha Ginde players
Beijing Renhe F.C. players
Guangzhou F.C. players
Tianjin Tianhai F.C. players
Wuhan F.C. players
Chinese Super League players
China League One players
Association football defenders